Pimelia is a genus of darkling beetles in the subfamily Pimeliinae.

Species

 Pimelia aculeata Klug, 1830
 Pimelia akbesiana Fairmaire, 1884 
 Pimelia angulata Fabricius, 1775 
 Pimelia angusticollis Solier, 1836 
 Pimelia arabica Klug, 1830 
 Pimelia arenacea Solier, 1836 
 Pimelia ascendens Wollaston, 1864 
 Pimelia baetica Solier, 1836 
 Pimelia bajula Klug, 1830 
 Pimelia barmerensis Kulzer, 1956 
 Pimelia bipunctata Fabricius, 1781 
 Pimelia boyeri Solier, 1836 
 Pimelia brevicollis Solier, 1836 
 Pimelia canariensis Brullé, 1838 
 Pimelia capito Krynicky, 1832 
 Pimelia cephalotes (Pallas, 1781) 
 Pimelia costata Waltl, 1835 
 Pimelia cribra Solier, 1836 
 Pimelia elevata Sénac, 1887 
 Pimelia estevezi Oromí, 1990 
 Pimelia fairmairei Kraatz, 1865 
 Pimelia fernandezlopezi Machado, 1979 
 Pimelia fornicata Herbst, 1799 
 Pimelia goryi Solier, 1836 
 Pimelia graeca Brullé, 1832 
 Pimelia grandis Klug, 1830 
 Pimelia granulata Solier, 1836 
 Pimelia granulicollis Wollaston, 1864 
 Pimelia grossa Fabricius, 1792 
 Pimelia incerta Solier, 1836 
 Pimelia indica Sénac, 1882 
 Pimelia integra Rosenhauer, 1856 
 Pimelia interjecta Solier, 1836 
 Pimelia laevigata Brullé, 1838 
 Pimelia lutaria Brullé, 1838 
 Pimelia maura Solier, 1836 
 Pimelia minos Lucas, 1853 
 Pimelia modesta Herbst, 1799 
 Pimelia monticola Rosenh., 1856 
 Pimelia nazarena Miller, 1861
 Pimelia orientalis Senac, 1886 
 Pimelia payraudi Latreille, 1829 
 Pimelia perezi Sénac, 1887 
 Pimelia punctata Solier, 1836 
 Pimelia radula Solier, 1836 
 Pimelia repleta Reitter, 1915 
 Pimelia rotundata Solier, 1836 
 Pimelia rotundipennis Kraatz, 1865 
 Pimelia rugosa Fabricius, 1792 
 Pimelia rugulosa Germar, 1824 
 Pimelia ruida Solier, 1836 
 Pimelia scabrosa Solier, 1836 
 Pimelia sericea Olivier, 1795
 Pimelia simplex Solier, 1836
 Pimelia sparsa Brullé, 1838 
 Pimelia subglobosa (Pallas, 1781) 
 Pimelia testudo Kraatz, 1885 
 Pimelia undulata Solier, 1836 
 Pimelia variolosa Solier, 1836 
 Pimelia ventricosa Falderm., 1837
 Pimelia verruculifera Soliér, 1836
 Pimelia villanovae Sénac, 1887

Reproduction
Pimelia are univoltine, with one generation per year. Species in North Africa emerge in January to begin mating, synchronously with floral bloom. Normally Pimelia are detrivores, but during mating season they may cannibalize other adults, larvae, and eggs. This behavior may be due to need for extra nutrients or simply to eliminate competitors. Following behavior  and mating take place on the slip face of a sand dune.  After mating, the female digs a shallow hole and deposits a single egg, which closely resembles a grain of white rice. As the temperature rises above 50 °C the adult population dies off. Immature stages remain below the surface until maturity.  During the winter the adults emerge.

Desert adaptations
Many Pimelia species are conspicuous as they cross sand dunes. Locomotion in this difficult terrain is facilitated by numerous tarsal setae that allow for rapid tumbling behavior.

Adaptations to arid climates and desert environments allow Pimelia to survive and reproduce in the dunes, but the relative importance of abiotic and biotic factors in this respect is not clear.  Environmental factors influencing these adaptations are extremes of temperature and humidity, excessive radiant energy, low and irregular rainfall, long periods of drought, strong winds, unstable sand substrates, and sparse, specialized vegetation.

Several morphological adaptations allow Pimelia to survive in the desert, including the lipid layers of the epicuticle, fused sclerites, the subelytral cavity, and the texture of the body surface. Much of the success of tenebrionid beetles in desert habitats is due to the development of impermeable cuticles. The fused sclerites of desert tenebrionids minimize water loss, but they result in flightlessness. The main barrier to the outward flow of water through insect integument is the lipid layer of the epicuticle. In many terrestrial arthropods, the temperature affects the permeability of the cuticle. There is a sudden increase in the rate of transpiration at what is known as the transition temperature. This may coincide with a physical change, perhaps the disorientation of the lipid molecules in the epicuticle. In tenebrionid beetles, the spiracles open into a humid subelytral cavity rather than directly to the atmosphere, thus reducing water loss. Water retention by intact elytral covers is greater at 0% relative humidity than at 97%. The size of the cavity is not important. Transpiration increases if the elytra are removed, emphasizing the importance of the epicuticle and subelytral cavity. Pimelia have tubercles on the surface of their elytra which scatter and reflect incident energy.

Burrowing is probably the most important behavior modification for heat regulation in Pimelia, because it permits access to a broad range of ambient temperatures.<ref>Hamilton, W. J. Coloration and its Thermal Consequences for Diurnal Desert Insects.  Stroudsburg, PA: Dowden, Hutchinson & Ross. 1975.</ref> Pimelia are diurnal, emerging in early morning and late evening but remaining under the sand during the hot hours of the day.

Gallery

References

Further reading
 Watt, J. C. (1974). A revised subfamily classification of Tenebrionidae (Coleoptera). New Zealand Journal of Zoology'' 1(4). 

Pimeliinae
Tenebrionidae genera
Articles containing video clips